Ranjan Kumar Bezbaruah is an Indian singer, lyricist, translator and academician engaged in promoting Modern Sanskrit Lyrical Literature. He is a vocal artiste of ‘Sanskrit songs’ contributing to All India Radio, Delhi Doordarshan & other regional & national platforms. He was honoured with 'Rashtriya Sanskrit Geetikavi' in 2020 by an international organisation.

Personal life 
Ranjan Bezbaruah was born on 1 August 1971 in Chakalaghat, Hatichong, Nagaon district of Assam. His father Rohit Chandra Bezbaruah was an educationist, writer and his mother Sri Subhadra Bezbaruah is a teacher, artist. Bezbaruah married to Bornali Parashar of Tezpur-Jamugurihat in 2002. They has two children, a son Jishnu and a daughter Mayukhi.

Cultural and academic activity 
Sanskrit version of a number of patriotic Indian  songs of the maestros like Rabindranath Tagore & Md. Iqbal, Kazi Nazrul, Kavi Pradeep and so on. Moreover, has been rendering his vocal to a few rare Hindi film songs with dignified lyrics & music encompassing K. L. Saigal to A. R. Rahman along with a few popular Ghazals and Bhajans.

He has been translating popular and patriotic songs from Assamese, Bengali and Hindi into Sanskrit and singing them since 1999.

Presented the Sanskrit rendition of the patriotic song- Md. Iqbal's  'Sare Jahan se Accha' which was produced and published by the national media, DDNews, Delhi for the first time, on the grand occasion of india's 70th independence day, on 14 August 2016. It was translated and sung by Ranjan Bezbaruah along with other vocalists.

He started 'Prachyaa', the first Sanskrit band from North East India and second in India in 2017.

Awards

References 

 

Singers from Assam
People from Nagaon district
1971 births
Sanskrit-language singers
Living people